Thomas Drummond (October 16, 1809 – May 15, 1890) was a United States circuit judge of the United States Circuit Courts for the Seventh Circuit and previously was a United States District Judge of the United States District Court for the District of Illinois and the United States District Court for the Northern District of Illinois.

Education and career

Born on October 16, 1809, in Bristol Mills, Maine, Drummond graduated from Bowdoin College in 1830 and read law in 1833. He entered private practice in Galena, Illinois from 1835 to 1850. He was a member of the Illinois House of Representatives from 1840 to 1841. He was a Judge of the Illinois Circuit Court from circa 1841 to circa 1850.

Federal judicial service

Drummond was nominated by President Zachary Taylor on January 31, 1850, to a seat on the United States District Court for the District of Illinois vacated by Judge Nathaniel Pope. He was confirmed by the United States Senate on February 19, 1850, and received his commission the same day. Drummond was reassigned by operation of law to the United States District Court for the Northern District of Illinois on February 13, 1855, to a new seat authorized by 10 Stat. 606. His service terminated on December 22, 1869, due to his elevation to the Seventh Circuit.

Drummond was nominated by President Ulysses S. Grant on December 8, 1869, to a new seat on the United States Circuit Courts for the Seventh Circuit authorized by 16 Stat. 44. He was confirmed by the Senate on December 22, 1869, and received his commission the same day. His service terminated on July 18, 1884, due to his retirement.

Death

Drummond died on May 15, 1890, in Wheaton, Illinois.

References

Sources
 
 Richard Cahan, A Court That Shaped America: Chicago's Federal District Court from Abe Lincoln to Abbie Hoffman, Ch. 1  (Northwestern University Press, 2002)

1809 births
1890 deaths
19th-century American judges
Illinois state court judges
Judges of the United States circuit courts
Judges of the United States District Court for the District of Illinois
Judges of the United States District Court for the Northern District of Illinois
Members of the Illinois House of Representatives
People from Galena, Illinois
United States federal judges appointed by Ulysses S. Grant
United States federal judges appointed by Zachary Taylor
United States federal judges admitted to the practice of law by reading law
People from Bristol, Maine
19th-century American politicians